Mylothrites pluto is an extinct butterfly known from Late Miocene-aged strata in Öhningen, Germany, at the border between Germany and Switzerland.

Taxonomy
The fossil was originally placed in Vanessa by Oswald Heer, but was then moved to its own genus, Mylothrites, by Samuel Scudder.

References

†
Miocene insects
Prehistoric insects of Europe
Fossil taxa described in 1875
Fossil Lepidoptera